is a Japanese manga series written and illustrated by Yuuki Iinuma. It was serialized in Shogakukan's Weekly Shōnen Sunday, where it ran for a year, from January 2009 to February 2010, and it was subsequently transferred to Club Sunday, where it ran from February 2010 to August 2013. Its chapters were collected in twenty-two tankōbon volumes published by Shogakukan. In North America, it was licensed for English release by Viz Media.

Plot 
Utsuho’s truthfulness as a child resulted in an enormous catastrophe, and he decided to lie from that day forward. Raised in a village of orphans by a monk, Utsuho is an unrepentant troublemaker. The monk eventually inspires him to help people, but there’s no way Utsuho’s going to lead an honest life! Instead, he’s going to use his talents for mischief and deception for good!

As he travels, he meets Pochi, an innocent tanuki, Yakuma, a serious, skilled young doctor, and Neya, an elegant teenage girl who is an itsuwaribito with an innocent personality. With these 3 main companions, Utsuho travels to Japan to increase the numbers of his family and save people with his lies.

Characters 

 Utsuho is the trouble-making protagonist of "Itsuwaribito ." An itsuwaribito with the motto of "karma," Utsuho is a white-haired teen-aged boy, his hair spiked straight up with a headband. Early in the series, he never let his hair down, however, later on, he often has it let down. It is unknown where he originally comes from, but he speaks with a Kansai dialect. Originally the son of a government official, he is an orphan due to the murder of his parents by thieves as a child. He knows that since he could only tell the truth when he was a child and told the thieves the entire layout of the house, it is his fault that his parents and servants were killed so easily. As such, as a teenager, he believed telling the truth was for idiots, and always lied as an Itswarubito. However, the priest who took him in told Utsuho on his deathbed that he wanted Utsuho to believe in people, and not always rely on lies. Taking the priest's final wish of wanting to save 1,000 people, Utsuho decides to go on a journey to complete this goal as an Itsuwaribito. He has skills in fishing, bomb-making, weapon-wielding, minor medical aid, quick disguises, and fights through his cleverness. He did have a butterfly blade hidden in his sleeve for close combat, but it was broken by the enemy in chapter 39. After this, he obtains dual blades, and he now often uses these. He wields his weapons and battle strategies aloofly, and has confidence in his ability to not be tricked. He loves playing pranks and tricking people with his lies, and often has the most fun tricking Yakuma, but does not try and trick Uzume or Pochi as often. On the other hand, he hates to be tricked, and also hates troublesome things. He is quite studied and has knowledge of many things, but that knowledge was all learned from books in the village of the orphans, so when he experiences something, he's never seen before, he has a tendency of getting excited. His catchphrases are "That's uncool," and "I was lying about lying ."
 A tanuki who can speak the human language. It speaks about himself in the first person in the Japanese manga. Its gender is unknown, and when it met with Utsuho, it was around eight months old. Pochi puts "san" (a rough equivalent of Mr. or Ms.) at the end of everyone's name he meets, and speaks in polite speech. Its mother was killed by a cruel trapper, and was saved by Utsuho when it seemed Pochi was going to be captured as well. It then becomes "family" with Utsuho, and goes on his journey to save 1,000 people with him as the first member of his party. It has a very strong bond with Utsuho, and likely has the most trust in him. It is very polite and has very good manners, but has some faults in its thinking, and is quite an optimistic airhead. Because of this, Pochi often causes trouble for the other members of the party. When Pochi's heart is moved by something, it has a habit of clapping its hands in applause. Pochi is the opposite of Utsho, as it has no skills in lying in the least, and is quite simple. However, thanks to that simplicity, Pochi was able to obtain one of the 9 Treasures, the "Seven-Colored Rainbow" very easily, which the others could not do. At the beginning of the series, Pochi was very weak-willed, but in later developments Pochi has gained the courage to draw on the enemy's faces or try to save Utsuho from danger. As Pochi has been "raised" by Utsuho, Pochi has come to not know fear. Pochi has a tendency to draw out his sentences, adding "～" marks to the end of his speech to show his slow-speaking personality.
 An 18-year-old stellar doctor who is looking for a remedy for one of his patients in the capital. He plays the tsukkomi role in the series. He is a very serious (if not too serious) young man with long black hair and sharp, blue eyes. However, in the battle against Chouza, his hair got cut in one of his attacks, and is now a little above his shoulders as a semi-long cut. He does not use weapons, but can take many hits, and has the power that can take down even a large man with a single attack. Utsuho recognizes that skill and his seriousness, and he is one of the allies he relies on the most, along with Pochi and Neya. Although his sense of responsibility and power of judgement are very strong, he often gets tricked, and to this there are many times that Utsuho chides him for it. His power of analysis is very high, as he was able to know the identity of a cross-dressing man, and was able to notice the feelings of love Neya holds for Utsuho.
He hates Itsuwaribito, and at first, Utsuho was no exception and Yakuma distrusted him. However, after working with him and Pochi for a while, he was able to trust him very much. At the same time, he gets a tendency to always worry about the big-mouthed Utsuho and Pochi, and gets called "Mom" or "sister-in-law" by them for it. As the elder member of the group, he often cheers up Neya, and also cheers on her love towards Utsuho. He is in fact a foreigner, which is proved by his knowledge of foreign surgeries, knowing foreign stories the others do not know, and also not knowing Japanese tales which all the others do.
In fact, in order to save the emperor, he was called to the imperial palace directly by the emperor, and has long aquainatances within the palace. He has feelings more than obligation towards the empress, and in order to receive favor from her, he is determined to find a cure for the emperor.
 A 16-year-old female Itsuwaribito who was exiled to Nadeshiko Island who is not related to any crimes. She speaks in a royal, high-class lady speak in the Japanese version. She has crimson eyes and hair that is lightly colored with a cherry blossom pink. She used to wear her hair in joined pigtails, but since her hair ornaments, she always wore were discovered to be one of the 9 treasures, the ornate hairpin, "Peacock Feather," she now wears her hair in a ponytail. She is very good with lies, so good that she was able to trick Utsuho once. She is quite down-to-earth and has it together, but there are times that she is very clumsy, and often causes many mistakes that cannot even be joked about. Chouza even says, "She doesn't look like she'd be any help in battle ." Her main weapon is a bow and arrow, but in fact, it is a tool to help hide her true weapon of kunai. Her prison time on Nadeshiko Island was in fact far over, but she stayed on the island and helped to take care of the island's many children. However, the people of the island wished for Neya to be free and go to the mainland, and with their plans, they tricked Neya to go with Utsuho. At the same time, she received the villager's sincerity, and became determined to create a village on the mainland for all of them. She continues to aim to recruit Yakuma as the village's doctor. She is in love with Utsuho, and always tries to help him, but these efforts often end up with no results. Utsuho has shown some slight signs of affection towards her.
An orphan, Neya was taken in by a princess who was called "Oni-hime" (lit. Ogre Princess), and became her body double due to her striking similarity in appearance. Due to this, her speech changed to one of a high-class lady. She and the princess were best friends, and had a relationship similar to sisters. However, when the castle was under attack and all the guards were killed, the princess wanted Neya to live, so she gave her hair ornament (Which was actually one of the nine treasures, "Peacock Feather" (孔雀の羽; Kujaku no Hane) and entrusted her with it. The princess was killed in place of Neya, and in order to hide away, Neya went to Nadeshiko Island.
 A man who is the guard to one of the 9 Treasures, the jewel, "Eye Stone" (JP: 瞳石;Hitomi Ishi). He has hanging eyes like a beast, and short, green spiky hair with a long bandana headband tied on his forehead. He is an itsuwaribito, and Hikae himself says that he has lived at least 500 years, which is actually quite possible, as there is much evidence that he is in fact immortal.  Poisons and hallucinogens do not work on him, and if he is injured, it will cure within a moment. This is the same even if he receives a wound that should be fatal, and he takes fatal wounds quite calmly. He is quite an enigma to the entire party, including even Utsuho. He acts very aloof and never shows his true intentions to the party, quite similar to Utsuho. He has the thinking process of, "Life isn't worth anything if there's nothing interesting in it," and as such, if things are interesting, he doesn't care about common sense or morals. He hates anything boring, and also hates Neya and Yakuma. On the other hand, he likes Utsuho and Pochi. Later, when she joins their party, he gets along very well with Iwashi, and their ways of thinking often match. After travelling for a time with Neya, he comes to hold her dear, but still hates Yakuma, who is very serious. In a trial in which the group had to hand over a treasure, he suffered a mental breakdown along with Utsuho, and after Utsuho completed the trial and received the treasure, Utsuho told him, "If you're free, come with us.," and so Hikae became one of their allies. Because Hikae is a guardsman of one of the 9 Treasures, he is quite knowledgeable on them, and as such, many times the destinations of the party is decided on this information, and he is a vital asset. However, there are many times when he says inappropriate things, and often has falling-outs with members of the party. His weapons are tekko kagi, which are gloves with blades like claws. He has fighting strength that is even recognized by Chouza, and with this he easily defeated Manta. He has become a being that has no need for food intake or sleep, and because of this he is always on lookout at night.
 A 20-year-old princess who was enthroned after she took over the village that banned men and elderly, "Yome Mura" (lit. Bride Village). A beautiful woman with black short-cut hair. She ends her sentences with the inflection "~n" in the Japanese version, which is very rare. She has one of the 9 Treasures, the face powder, "Cherry Blossom Rouge" in her possession. Her skin, which is praised as the most beautiful in Japan, is her pride, and she holds quite a bit of confidence when it comes to her physique, and as such wears many clothes that expose her body. When she was in her village, she hated filthy and ugly things. Because of this hate, she demolished and rebuilt the entire village, and exiled animals, human males, the sick and such other people from the village. When she met Utsuho for the first time at the Hydrangea Flower Mansion, they were met with grave danger when Iriya incited a raid, and she saved Utsuho from a dangerous situation.
In return for "The most beautiful thing in this world," she promises to hand over her treasure to Utsuho and his party. To meet this request, Utsuho gave her a mirror, telling her that the most beautiful thing in the world could be seen in it when she held it. Touched, she now calls Utsuho "Utsuho-sama" or "My lord," and decides to continue on their journey along with them. She also allowed the people she had kicked out of the village to return. She is unexpectedly quite a hard worker, and her heart is very kind. So kind, that she even gets along very well with her rival in love, Neya, saying "It is a wonderful thing when the amount of beautiful things increases in the world," and even helps her with her fashion. She is not affected by formality, and is a very flexible type of person. She is also very good with her hands, and because of this is a very reliable person. There are times when she uses seduction in order to get enemies to let down their guard.
 A 19-year-old warrior who is one of Kuroha's allies. He is a peppy, simple man, and is quite stupid. He often says saying and difficult words incorrectly, making him mostly comic relief. He is most often seen smiling with a wide open mouth. His weapon is a three-section staff with a small sickle attached, and has such power to the weapon that it does not matter if he is close or far in range to his opponent. He once told Utsuho, "My head's empty, but I get pissed." What he lacks in brains, he makes up with fighting power, which is top-class. It might be because he is quite honest, but his mouth more than often slips, letting out vital information. As an enemy, Utsuho called him "Bird brain," but once they became allies, Utsuho began calling him by his name.
Ever since the time Uzume was born, he was not treated like a human and was ostracized. Possibly due him receiving irrational violence and abuse, he came to think that it would be best to break anything he hated as he lived his life. On the other hand, he is quite friendly, and there are times when he gets lonely like a child. He also holds feelings that Kuroha and Chouza, who he likes, are precious to him. There was a time when he was being chased by Iriya and Utsuho proposed that they fight together, but thinking about Kuroha, he turned him down. He likes Utsuho and has a crush on Neya (apparently, she's exactly his type), and thinks of them both as his friends. At the Black Fortress, when he talked to Utsuho, he decided that he wanted to live a life without killing people. However, this decision led to a wall being made between himself and Kuroha, who he held dearly.
In the battle against Iriya at Bride Village, he saves his allies, but knowing that he was not trusted by Kuroha, he left Kuroha's group along with Chouza and Minamo to act with just the three of them. In the capital, Kuroha says some parting words, but Uzume wasn't satisfied, confirms Kuroha's real intentions, and travels with her once again.
Deeply hurt at the death of Kuroha and Saiha, he fights Iriya and wins, getting revenge for the two. After he learned the importance of people's lives, he swears in his heart to never kill another person ever again, and in order to make a world where no one suffers, he decides to join Utsuho's group along with Chouza and Minamo.

Publication
Written and illustrated by Yuuki Iinuma, Itsuwaribito started in Shogakukan's Weekly Shōnen Sunday on January 28, 2009. The series ran for 51 chapters, until February 10, 2010. It was then transferred to Shogakukan's web magazine Club Sunday, starting on February 19, 2010. The series finished with its 223rd chapter on August 27, 2013, and an additional chapter was released on September 3 of the same year. Shogakukan collected its chapters in twenty-three tankōbon volumes, released from May 18, 2009 to November 18, 2013.

In North America; Viz Media announced they license of the manga in July 2010. Viz Media released the twenty-three volumes from December 14, 2010 to April 10, 2018.

Volumes

Reception
Carlo Santos, writing for Anime News Network, felt that the series was a generic shōnen adventure series but enjoyed the lead's moral ambiguity, feeling it spiced up fight scenes. He criticized the poor pacing in the second volume. Katherine Dacey described the manga as a "tonal mess," contrasting the bloody fight scenes with the cute talking tanuki and the "uncomplicated" protagonist. Leroy Douresseaux felt the series had potential, enjoying the premise, and feeling that the series hit its stride more in the second volume. Danica Davidson felt that the lead became more sympathetic during the first volume. Holly von Winckel noted the extreme violence used by the author to distinguish the protagonist from the 'real' bad guys, feeling that the tanuki character was an "antidote" to this strong violence. Patti Martinson felt that the premise was gimmicky, but that the second volume "explored" the issue more than she had hoped. Nick Smith describes the lead character as being an "even less likeable version of Naruto," summing up the first volume as being both enjoyable and frustrating. Deb Aoki noted the combination of gore and cute elements, making the first volume "difficult to recommend ." Davey C. Jones enjoyed the fast pace of the second volume.

Notes

References

External links
Itsuwaribito official website at Web Sunday 
Itsuwaribito official website at Club Sunday 
Yuuki Iinuma's official blog 

2009 manga
Adventure anime and manga
Comedy anime and manga
Shogakukan manga
Shōnen manga
Viz Media manga